Terrel Edward "Tec" Clarke (March 20, 1920 – July 29, 1997) was an American politician, businessman, and politician.

Background
Clarke was born in Chicago, Illinois. He went to the Lyons Township High School in the Lyons Township Cook County, Illinois. Clarke served in the United States Army during World War II and was commissioned a staff sergeant. He received his bachelor's degree from University of Colorado and his master's degree from Harvard Business School. He taught business briefly at the University of Kansas. Clarke lived in Western Springs, Illinois with his wife and family. He was an insurance broker. Clarke served in the Illinois House of Representatives from 1957 to 1967 and was a Republican. He then served in the Illinois Senate from 1967 to 1977. Clarke died from heart failure at his family's summer home in Castle Park, Michigan.

Notes

External links

1920 births
1997 deaths
Businesspeople from Chicago
Politicians from Chicago
People from Western Springs, Illinois
Military personnel from Illinois
University of Colorado alumni
Harvard Business School alumni
University of Kansas faculty
Republican Party members of the Illinois House of Representatives
Republican Party Illinois state senators
20th-century American politicians
20th-century American businesspeople
United States Army personnel of World War II
United States Army soldiers